The Fugitive Slave Act or Fugitive Slave Law was passed by the United States Congress on September 18, 1850, as part of the Compromise of 1850 between Southern interests in slavery and Northern Free-Soilers.

The Act was one of the most controversial elements of the 1850 compromise and heightened Northern fears of a slave power conspiracy. It required that all escaped slaves, upon capture, be returned to the enslaver and that officials and citizens of free states had to cooperate. Abolitionists nicknamed it the "Bloodhound Bill", after the dogs that were used to track down people fleeing from slavery.

The Act contributed to the growing polarization of the country over the issue of slavery. It was one of the factors that led to the American Civil War.

Background

By 1843, several hundred enslaved people a year escaped to the North successfully, making slavery an unstable institution in the border states.

The earlier Fugitive Slave Act of 1793 was a Federal law that was written with the intent to enforce Article 4, Section 2, Clause 3 of the United States Constitution, which required the return of escaped slaves. It sought to force the authorities in free states to return fugitives of enslavement to their enslavers.

Many free states wanted to disregard the Fugitive Slave Act. Some jurisdictions passed personal liberty laws, mandating a jury trial before alleged fugitive slaves could be moved; others forbade the use of local jails or the assistance of state officials in arresting or returning alleged fugitive slaves. In some cases, juries refused to convict individuals who had been indicted under the Federal law.

The Missouri Supreme Court routinely held, with the laws of neighboring free states, that enslaved people who their enslavers had voluntarily transported into free states, with the intent of the enslavers' residing there permanently or indefinitely, gained their freedom as a result. The 1793 act dealt with enslaved people who escaped to free states without their enslavers' consent. The Supreme Court of the United States ruled, in Prigg v. Pennsylvania (1842), that states did not have to offer aid in the hunting or recapture of enslaved people, significantly weakening the law of 1793.

After 1840, the Black population of Cass County, Michigan, proliferated as families were attracted by white defiance of discriminatory laws, by numerous highly supportive Quakers, and by low-priced land. Free and escaping Blacks found Cass County a haven. Their good fortune attracted the attention of Southern slavers. In 1847 and 1849, planters from Bourbon and Boone counties, Kentucky, led raids into Cass County to recapture people escaping slavery. The attacks failed, but the situation contributed to Southern demands in 1850 to pass a strengthened fugitive slave act.

Southern politicians often exaggerated the number of people escaping enslavement, blaming the escapes on Northern abolitionists, whom they saw as stirring up their allegedly happy slaves, interfering with "Southern property rights". According to the Columbus [Georgia] Enquirer of 1850, The support from Northerners for fugitive slaves caused more ill will between the North and the South than all the other causes put together.

New law

In response to the weakening of the original Fugitive Slave Act, Democratic Senator James M. Mason of Virginia drafted the Fugitive Slave Act of 1850, which penalized officials who did not arrest someone allegedly escaping from slavery, and made them liable to a fine of $1,000. Law enforcement officials everywhere were required to arrest people suspected of escaping enslavement on as little as a claimant's sworn testimony of ownership.  was declared irrelevant. The Commissioner before whom the fugitive from slavery was brought for a hearing—no jury was permitted, and the alleged refugee from enslavement could not testify—was compensated $10 if he found that the individual was proven a fugitive and only $5 if he determined the proof to be insufficient. In addition, any person aiding a fugitive by providing food or shelter was subject to six months imprisonment and a $1,000 fine. Officers who captured a fugitive from slavery were entitled to a bonus or promotion for their work.

Enslavers needed only to supply an affidavit to a Federal marshal to capture a fugitive from slavery. Since a suspected enslaved person was not eligible for a trial, the law resulted in the kidnapping and conscription of free Blacks into slavery, as purported fugitive slaves had no rights in court and could not defend themselves against accusations.

The Act adversely affected the prospects of escape from slavery, particularly in states close to the North. One study finds that while prices placed on enslaved people rose across the Southern United States in the years after 1850, it appears that "the 1850 Fugitive Slave Act increased prices in border states by 15% to 30% more than in states further south", illustrating how the Act altered the chance of successful escape.

According to abolitionist John Brown, even in the supposedly safe refuge of Springfield, Massachusetts, "some of them are so alarmed that they tell me that they cannot sleep on account of either them or their wives and children. I can only say I think I have been enabled to do something to revive their broken spirits. I want all my family to imagine themselves in the same dreadful condition."

Judicial nullification

In 1855, the Wisconsin Supreme Court became the only state high court to declare the Fugitive Slave Act unconstitutional as a result of a case involving fugitive slave Joshua Glover and Sherman Booth, who led efforts that thwarted Glover's recapture. In 1859 in Ableman v. Booth, the U.S. Supreme Court overruled the state court.

Jury nullification occurred as local Northern juries acquitted men accused of violating the law. Secretary of State Daniel Webster was a key supporter of the law, as expressed in his famous "Seventh of March" speech. He wanted high-profile convictions. The jury nullifications ruined his presidential aspirations and his last-ditch efforts to find a compromise between North and South. Webster led the prosecution against men accused of rescuing Shadrach Minkins in 1851 from Boston officials who intended to return Minkins to slavery; the juries convicted none of the men. Webster sought to enforce a law that was extremely unpopular in the Northern United States, and his Whig Party passed him over again when they chose a presidential nominee in 1852.

Legislative nullification 

In November 1850, the Vermont legislature passed the Habeas Corpus Law, requiring Vermont judicial and law enforcement officials to assist captured fugitive slaves. It also established a state judicial process, parallel to the federal process, for people accused of being fugitive slaves. This law rendered the federal Fugitive Slave Act effectively unenforceable in Vermont and caused a storm of controversy nationally. It was considered a nullification of federal law, a concept popular among slave states that wanted to nullify other aspects of federal law, and was part of highly charged debates over slavery. Noted poet and abolitionist John Greenleaf Whittier had called for such laws, and the Whittier controversy heightened pro-slavery reactions to the Vermont law. Virginia governor John B. Floyd warned that nullification could push the South toward secession. At the same time, President Millard Fillmore threatened to use the army to enforce the Fugitive Slave Act in Vermont. No test events took place in Vermont, but the rhetoric of this flare-up echoed South Carolina's 1832 nullification crisis and Thomas Jefferson's 1798 Kentucky Resolutions.

In February 1855, Michigan's legislature also passed a law prohibiting county jails from being used to detain recaptured slaves, directing county prosecutors to defend recaptured slaves, and entitling recaptured slaves to habeas corpus and trial by jury. Other states to pass personal liberty laws include Connecticut, Massachusetts, Maine, New Hampshire, Ohio, Pennsylvania and Wisconsin.

Resistance in the North and other consequences 
The Fugitive Slave Law brought the issue home to anti-slavery citizens in the North, as it made them and their institutions responsible for enforcing slavery. "Where before many in the North had little or no opinions or feelings on slavery, this law seemed to demand their direct assent to the practice of human bondage, and it galvanized Northern sentiments against slavery." Moderate abolitionists were faced with the immediate choice of defying what they believed to be an unjust law or breaking with their consciences and beliefs. Harriet Beecher Stowe wrote Uncle Tom's Cabin (1852) in response to the law.

Many abolitionists openly defied the law. Reverend Luther Lee, pastor of the Wesleyan Methodist Church of Syracuse, New York, wrote in 1855:

There were several instances of Northern communities putting words like these into action. Several years before, in the Jerry Rescue, Syracuse abolitionists freed by force a fugitive slave who was to be sent back to the South and successfully smuggled him to Canada. Thomas Sims and Anthony Burns were both captured fugitives who were part of unsuccessful attempts by opponents of the Fugitive Slave Law to use force to free them. Other famous examples include Shadrach Minkins in 1851 and Lucy Bagby in 1861, whose forcible return has been cited by historians as important and "allegorical". Pittsburgh abolitionists organized groups whose purpose was the seizure and release of any enslaved person passing through the city, as in the case of a free black servant of the Slaymaker family, erroneously the subject of a rescue by black waiters in a hotel dining room. If fugitives from slavery were captured and put on trial, abolitionists worked to defend them in trial, and if by chance the recaptured person had their freedom put up for a price, abolitionists worked to pay to free them. Other opponents, such as African-American leader Harriet Tubman, treated the law as just another complication in their activities.

On April 5, 1859, Daniel Webster, after being seized in Harrisburg, Pennsylvania, on the accusation that he was actually Daniel Dangerfield, an escaped slave from Loudoun County, Virginia, had a court hearing. The federal commissioner in Philadelphia, J. Cooke Longstreth, set him free because, in his opinion, it had not been proven that Daniel Webster was a fugitive slave. Webster promptly left for Canada.

Canada
One important consequence was that Canada, not the Northern free states, became the foremost destination for escaped slaves. The black population of Canada increased from 40,000 to 60,000 between 1850 and 1860, and many reached freedom by the Underground Railroad. Notable black publishers, such as Henry Bibb and Mary Ann Shadd, created publications encouraging emigration to Canada. By 1855, an estimated 3,500 people among Canada's black population were fugitives from American slavery. In Pittsburgh, for example, during the September following the passage of the law, organized groups of escaped slaves, armed and sworn to "die rather than be taken back into slavery", set out for Canada, with more than 200 men leaving by the end of the month. The black population in New York City dropped by almost 2,000 from 1850 to 1855.

On the other hand, many Northern businessmen supported the law due to their commercial ties with the Southern states. They founded the Union Safety Committee and raised thousands of dollars to promote their cause, which gained sway, particularly in New York City, and caused public opinion to shift somewhat towards supporting the law.

End of the Act
In the early stages of the American Civil War, the Union had no established policy on people escaping from slavery. Many enslaved people left their plantations heading for Union lines. Still, in the early stages of the war, fugitives from slavery were often returned by Union forces to their enslavers. General Benjamin Butler and some other Union generals, however, refused to recapture fugitives under the law because the Union and the Confederacy were at war. He confiscated enslaved people as contraband of war and set them free, with the justification that the loss of labor would also damage the Confederacy. Lincoln allowed Butler to continue his policy but countermanded broader directives issued by other Union commanders that freed all enslaved people in places under their control.

In August 1861, the U.S. Congress enacted the Confiscation Act, which barred enslavers from re-enslaving captured fugitives. The legislation, sponsored by Lyman Trumbull, was passed on a near-unanimous vote and established military emancipation as official Union policy, but applied only to enslaved people used by rebel enslavers to support the Confederate cause. Union Army forces sometimes returned fugitives from slavery to enslavers until March 1862, when Congress enacted legislation barring Union forces from returning anyone to slavery. James Mitchell Ashley proposed legislation to repeal the Fugitive Slave Act, but the bill did not make it out of committee in 1863. Although the Union policy of confiscation and military emancipation had effectively superseded the operation of the Fugitive Slave Act, the Fugitive Slave Act was only formally repealed in June 1864. The New York Tribune hailed the repeal, writing: "The blood-red stain that has blotted the statute-book of the Republic is wiped out forever."

See also
 Fugitive slave laws in the United States
 Ableman v. Booth
 Contraband (American Civil War)
 Emancipation Proclamation
 Fugitive Slave Convention of 1850, Cazenovia, New York
 Prigg v. Pennsylvania
 Slave Trade Acts
 Underground Railroad

Incidents involving the Fugitive Slave Act of 1850 (in chronological order)
 Fugitive Slave Convention, August 1850, Cazenovia, New York
 The act passes Congress and is signed by the President on September 18, 1850
 Seizure and enslavement of James Hamlet, September 26, 1850, Williamsburg, New York
 Escape of Shadrach Minkins, February 1851, Boston
 Reenslavement of Thomas Sims, April 1851, Boston
 Christiana Riot, September 1851, Christiana, Pennsylvania
 Jerry Rescue, October 1851, Syracuse, New York
 Escape of Joshua Glover, March 1854, Milwaukee
 Reenslavement of Anthony Burns, May/June 1854, Boston
 Attempted reenslavement of Jane Johnson, July 1855, Philadelphia
 Oberlin–Wellington Rescue, September 1858, Oberlin and Wellington, Ohio
 Escape of Charles Nalle, November 1860, Troy, New York

References

Sources
 
 
 
 "Fugitive Slave Law" (2008)

Further reading

External links

 Complete text of the Fugitive Slave Law of 1850
 Compromise of 1850 and related resources at the Library of Congress
 "Slavery in Massachusetts" by Henry David Thoreau
 Runaway Slaves a Primary Source Adventure featuring fugitive slave advertisements from the 1850s, hosted by The Portal to Texas History
 Serialized version of Uncle Tom's Cabin in The National Era by the Harriet Beecher Stowe Center

1850 in American politics
1850 in American law
Extradition in the United States
Presidency of Millard Fillmore
Origins of the American Civil War
United States federal slavery legislation
Fugitive American slaves
31st United States Congress